Mario Mantovan (born 8 May 1965) is an Italian former professional racing cyclist. He rode in the 1993 and 1994 Tour de France.

References

External links
 

1965 births
Living people
Italian male cyclists
Cyclists from the Province of Como